The WSSUS (Wide-Sense Stationary Uncorrelated Scattering) model provides a statistical description of the transmission behavior of wireless channels.  "Wide-sense stationarity" means the second-order moments of the channel are stationary, which means that they depends only on the time difference, while "uncorrelated scattering" refers to the delay τ due to scatterers.
Modelling of mobile channels as WSSUS (wide sense stationary uncorrelated scattering) has become popular among specialists.  The model was introduced by Phillip A. Bello in 1963.

A commonly used description of time variant channel applies the set of Bello functions and the theory of stochastic processes.

References

Kurth, R. R.; Snyder, D. L.; Hoversten, E. V. (1969) "Detection and Estimation Theory", Massachusetts Institute of Technology, Research Laboratory of Electronics, Quarterly Progress Report, No. 93 (IX), 177–205

Primary documents 
 Bello, Phillip A., "Characterization of randomly time-variant linear channels", IEEE Transactions on Communications Systems, vol. 11, iss. 4, pp. 360-393, December 1963.

External links
Wide Sense Stationary Uncorrelated Scattering at www.WirelessCommunication.NL

Information theory
Scattering
Scattering, absorption and radiative transfer (optics)
Signal processing
Stochastic models
Telecommunication theory
Wireless
Wireless networking